The red-and-white antpitta (Grallaria erythroleuca) is a species of bird in the family Grallariidae. It is endemic to Peru. Its natural habitats are subtropical or tropical moist montane forest and heavily degraded former forest.

References

red-and-white antpitta
Birds of the Peruvian Andes
Endemic birds of Peru
red-and-white antpitta
red-and-white antpitta
Taxonomy articles created by Polbot